Guy Gedalyah Stroumsa (born 27 July 1948) is an Israeli scholar of religion. He is Martin Buber Professor Emeritus of Comparative Religion at the Hebrew University of Jerusalem and Emeritus Professor of the Study of the Abrahamic Religions at the University of Oxford, where he is an Emeritus Fellow of Lady Margaret Hall. He is a Member of the Israel Academy of Sciences and Humanities.

Biography
Stroumsa was born in Paris. His parents were Shoah survivors; his father, born in Salonica, survived Auschwitz thanks to his musical skills and his mother, born in Athens, Bergen-Belsen.
Stroumsa grew up in Paris. He studied at the Lycée Voltaire and at the Ecole Normale Israélite Orientale, where he was greatly influenced by its principal, Emmanuel Levinas, who taught him philosophy and Talmud. After briefly studying economics and law at the University of Paris, he moved to Israel. For his B.A. (1969), he studied philosophy and Jewish thought at the Hebrew University of Jerusalem. After his military service (1969–1972), he studied for the PhD in the Study of Religion at Harvard University. After the submission of his doctoral dissertation (1978) which dealt with Gnostic mythology, he was appointed a lecturer in the Department of Comparative Religion at the Hebrew University. In 1991 he was appointed to the Martin Buber Chair of Comparative Religion. Stroumsa was the Founding Director of the Center for the Study of Christianity (1999–2005). In 2009 he was appointed Professor of the Study of the Abrahamic Religions at Oxford University and a Fellow of Lady Margaret Hall; he retired in 2013.

He has held Visiting Professorship in a number of universities in Europe and the United States, and has been a Fellow, among other institutions, of Dumbarton Oaks, the Wissenschaftskolleg zu Berlin, and the Katz Center for Advanced Judaic Studies. He has been invited to give Lecture Series at Corpus Christi College and Trinity College, Cambridge, at the Scuola Normale Superiore (Pisa) and the Istituto San Carlo (Modena), and at the College de France (Paris).

Stroumsa received an honorary doctorate from the University of Zurich (2005). In 2008 he was elected a Member of the Israeli Academy of the Sciences and Humanities. He won an Alexander von Humboldt Research Award in 2008. Together with Sarah Stroumsa, he is a recipient of the Leopold Lucas Prize (2018). He is Chevalier de l’Ordre du Mérite.

He is married to Professor Sarah Stroumsa, a scholar of Islamic and Jewish medieval philosophy and theology, who served for four years as the Rector of the Hebrew University of Jerusalem. They have two daughters and five grandchildren.

Research
Guy Stroumsa's research focuses on the dynamics of encounters between religious traditions and institutions in the Roman Empire and in Late Antiquity, in the Mediterranean and the Middle East. He has studied the crystallization of the Abrahamic traditions in late antiquity, as a background to Islam. He sees Gnosis, Manichaeism and Early Christianity as a unique laboratory for understanding religious transformations in late antiquity. In his doctoral dissertation, Stroumsa studied the development of Gnostic mythology, and demonstrated its roots in Judaism and biblical interpretation. In his studies, Stroumsa seeks to cross traditional interdisciplinary boundaries in order to study religious phenomena from a comparative perspective. This approach permits him to understand the mechanisms behind the religious revolution of Late Antiquity, a period which saw the cessation of a number of widespread aspects of ancient religion (such as blood sacrifice) and the development of new systems, which stand at the basis of Judaism, Christianity and Islam.

Stroumsa also works on the history of scholarship on religion, from early modern times to the twentieth century.

Stroumsa is the author of fourteen books, and the editor or co-editor of some twenty books. He has published more than a hundred and thirty articles.

Works

Books

 [revised and augmented paperback edition, 2005] = 

)
 =  = 

 
 
 With Sarah Stroumsa,  (Tübingen: Mohr Siebeck, 2020).
 The Idea of Semitic Monotheism: The Rise and Fall of a Scholarly Myth (Oxford: Oxford University Press, 2021)

as Editor
 With Sh. Shaked and D. Shulman: Gilgul: Transformations, Revolutions and Permanence in the History of Religions, in Honor of R. J. Z. Werblowsky (Suppl. to Numen 50; Leiden: Brill, 1987)
 With Sh. Shaked and I. Gruenwald: Messiah and Christos: Studies in the Jewish Origins of Christianity, presented to David Flusser at the Occasion of his Seventy Fifth Birthday (Tübingen: Mohr Siebeck, 1992)
 With O. Limor: Contra Judaeos: Ancient and Medieval Polemics Between Christians and Jews (Texts and Studies in Medieval and Early Modern Judaism: Tübingen: Mohr Siebeck; 1995)
 With H. G. Kippenberg: Secrecy and Concealment: Studies in the History of Mediterranean and Near Eastern Religions (Studies in the History of Religions 65; Leiden: Brill, 1995)
 Shlomo Pines, Studies in the History of Religion (The Collected Works of Shlomo Piines, volume IV; Jerusalem: Magnes, 1996), edited by Guy G. Stroumsa
 With G. Stanton: Tolerance and Intolerance in Ancient Judaism and Early Christianity (Cambridge: Cambridge University Press; 1998; Paperback edition, Cambridge, 2008)
 With A. Kofsky: Sharing the Sacred: Religious Contacts and Conflicts in the Holy Land, 1st.-15th century (Jerusalem: Ben Zvi; 1998)
 With A. Baumgarten and J. Assmann, Soul, Self, Body in Religious Experience: Studies in the History of Religions (Leiden: Brill, 1998)
 With D. Shulman: Dream Cultures: Explorations in the Comparative History of Dreaming (New York: Oxford University Press, 1999)
 With J. Assmann, Transforming the Inner Self in Ancient Religions (Leiden: Brill, 1999)
 With D. Shulman, Self and Self Transformation in the History of Religions (New York: Oxford University Press, 2001; Paperback edition, Oxford, 2002)
 With Jan Assmann,  3 (2002), "" (Munich, Leipzig: Saur)
 With M. Finkelberg, Homer, the Bible, and Beyond: Literary and Religious Canons in the Ancient World (Jerusalem Studies in Religion and Culture, 2; Leiden, Boston: Brill, 2003)
 With O. Limor, Christians and Christianity in the Holy Land: From the Origins to the Latin Kingdoms (Turnhout: Brepols, 2006)
 Gershom Scholem and Morton Smith: Correspondence, 1945-1982 (Jerusalem Studies in Religion and Culture; Leiden: Brill, 2008)
 With Markus Bockmuehl, Paradise in Antiquity: Jewish and Christian Views (Cambridge: Cambridge University Press, 2010)
 with R. Bonfil, O. Irshai and R. Talgam, eds., Jews of Byzantium: Dialectics of Minority and Majority Cultures  (Jerusalem Studies in Religion and Culture: Leiden: Brill, 2011)
 with Adam Silverstein and Moshe Blidstein, The Oxford Handbook of the Abrahamic Religions (Oxford: Oxford University Press, 2015)

Stroumsa is also the author of about 130 scholarly articles. Many of these articles can be found online on Guy Stroumsa's personal page on academia.edu

References

Living people
1948 births
Members of the Israel Academy of Sciences and Humanities
Academic staff of the Hebrew University of Jerusalem
Professors of the Study of the Abrahamic Religions
Harvard University alumni
Fellows of Lady Margaret Hall, Oxford
Hebrew University of Jerusalem alumni